Mohamed Mezghrani (born 2 June 1994) is an Algerian-Belgian professional footballer who plays as a full back for Puskás Akadémia in the Nemzeti Bajnokság I. He formerly played for Turnhout, Duffel, RKC Waalwijk in the Dutch Eerste Divisie and USM Alger.

Club career
On 2 June 2018 Mohamed Mezghrani joined to USM Alger for three seasons coming from Waalwijk. but his career was short and he left the club in winter Mercato after playing only two games, then Mezghrani return to Europe, where he joined Hungarian club Budapest Honvéd for only six months with a two-year option., and in the first season he reached the Magyar Kupa final where did they defeat against MOL Vidi, The following season Mezghrani missed due to injury for a half-season and the first game after the return was against Puskás FC on 22 February 2020. With Nemzeti Bajnokság I suspended due to COVID-19 for more than two months, the competition resumed again, Where did Mezghrani win the Magyar Kupa as the first title in its history.

On 3 January 2022, Mezghrani signed a 2.5-year contract with Puskás Akadémia.

Career statistics

Club

Honours
Budapest Honvéd
 Hungarian Cup: 2020

References

1994 births
Living people
Algerian footballers
Belgian footballers
KFC Turnhout players
RKC Waalwijk players
USM Alger players
Budapest Honvéd FC players
Puskás Akadémia FC players
Eerste Divisie players
Nemzeti Bajnokság I players
Algerian expatriate footballers
Expatriate footballers in the Netherlands
Expatriate footballers in Hungary
Algerian expatriate sportspeople in the Netherlands
Algerian expatriate sportspeople in Hungary
Association football fullbacks
21st-century Algerian people